The Indian Fantasy, Op. 44  is a fantasy for piano and orchestra by Ferruccio Busoni.  Composed in 1913/14, it was first performed in Berlin in March 1914, with the composer as soloist.  The piece is based on several melodies and rhythms from various American Indian tribes; Busoni had received them from American ethnomusicologist Natalie Curtis Burlin.  The fantasy describes the American prairie, and is in three movements:
Fantasy
Canzona
Finale

References

Curtis, Natalie. "Busoni’s Indian Fantasy" in Southern Workman vol. 44, October 1915, pp/ 538-543

Compositions by Ferruccio Busoni
1913 compositions
Compositions for piano and orchestra
Busoni